Twopenny (also Jarrawuk or Murrumgunarrimin) (c. 1845 – 12 March 1883) is generally acknowledged as the first Aboriginal Australian to play first-class cricket.

He was born in Bathurst, New South Wales. He joined the Australian Aboriginal cricket team on its tour to England in 1868. He was primarily a fast bowler, and a hard-hitting lower order batsman. His bowling was limited initially over concerns that his bowling action might be illegal, but taking advantage of the recent change in the Laws of Cricket to allow overarm bowling, he took 9/9 and 6/7 against an East Hampshire side at Southsea, and then 9/17 and 3/39 against a Hampshire team at Southampton. He played in 46 of the 47 matches on the tour, scoring 589 runs at an average of 8.29, and taking 35 wickets at an average of 6.9 from 704 balls bowled. Playing against a Sheffield team at Bramall Lane in August 1868, he hit the ball so far and high that the batsmen were able to run nine runs (with no overthrows).

He played in a single first-class match for New South Wales against Victoria in February 1870, scoring 8 and 0, and taking 0/41 and 0/15. In a timeless match, scores were similar after the first innings, but Victoria scored 337 in their second innings, and won by 265 runs.

He died in West Maitland, New South Wales, from dropsy.

See also
 Johnny Mullagh – Aboriginal Australian who played for Victoria against the MCC in 1879
 Jack Marsh – Aboriginal Australian who played for New South Wales from 1900 to 1902
 Albert Henry – Aboriginal Australian who played for Queensland from 1902 to 1905
 Eddie Gilbert – Aboriginal Australian who played for Queensland from 1930 to 1936
 List of New South Wales representative cricketers

References
 
 The Black Lords of Summer: The Story of the 1868 Aboriginal Tour of England and Beyond, Ashley Alexander Mallett, University of Queensland Press, 2002, p. 78-79, 163
 Once upon an all-run nine, Cricinfo, 12 August 2012

1845 births
1883 deaths
New South Wales cricketers
Indigenous Australian cricketers
People from Bathurst, New South Wales
Cricketers from New South Wales